Gärds Köpinge is a locality situated in Kristianstad Municipality, Skåne County, Sweden with 936 inhabitants in 2010.

The medieval Köpinge Church in Gärds Köpinge is richly decorated with medieval murals.

References 

Populated places in Kristianstad Municipality
Populated places in Skåne County